The VII World Rhythmic Gymnastics Championships were held on 20–23 November 1975 in Madrid, Spain.

Medal table

NOTE: Bulgaria, The Soviet Union and East Germany did not send any competitors.

Individual

Clubs

Ball

Ribbon

Hoop

Individual All-Around

Groups

Groups Final

Groups Preliminary

References 

Rhythmic Gymnastics World Championships
1975 in gymnastics
Rhy
November 1975 sports events in Europe
International gymnastics competitions hosted by Spain
Sports competitions in Madrid